Windamere Hotel, built as 'Ada Villa' in 1841 and then turned into a boarding house for tea planters and other Raj types, on contract, in the late 1880s.  In 1939, it became 'Windamere Hotel', a colonial hotel situated on Observatory Hill, in Darjeeling, India.

History
The hotel started out as boarding house for bachelor British tea planters in Darjeeling, in what was then British India, were built in 1841 and opened up as a boarding house in the late 1880s. The property named Adda Villa is owned by the family of Princess Aishwarya Rana Shah Chakrabarti . It was leased to Tenduf La, a Sikkimese of Tibetan descent, who turned it into a hotel with the name Windamere. The hotel became more widely known as Darjeeling became the Bengal Presidency's summer capital. It expanded and took over a new wing, formerly the Loreto Convent, where the actress Vivien Leigh had spent some years in childhood.

In 1959, Palden Thondup Namgyal, Crown Prince of Sikkim, met his future wife Hope Cooke for the first time in the Windamere Hotel.

The hotel is also known for its views of the tea plantations below and of Mount Kangchenjunga, the third highest peak in the world.

References

External links

Windamere Hotel, Darjeeling India

Tourist attractions in Darjeeling
Hotels in Darjeeling
Heritage hotels in India
Hotels established in 1939